Bosomtwe District is one of the 43 districts in Ashanti Region, Ghana. Originally, it was part of the then-larger Bosomtwe-Atwima-Kwanwoma District on 10 March 1989, which was created from the former Ejisu-Juaben-Bosomtwe District Council, until the western part of the district was split off on 29 February 2008 to create Atwima-Kwanwoma District; the remaining part was renamed Bosomtwe District. The district assembly is located in the central part of Ashanti Region and has Kuntanase as its capital town.

Tourism
Bosomtwe District contains Lake Bosumtwi, one of the largest natural lakes in the world. The lake resort is a popular tourist destination.

Economy
The district also contains minable gold, clay and sand.

References

 
 GhanaDistricts.com

Districts of Ashanti Region